John Pierpoint (1805–1882), Vermont State Senate
Robert Pierpoint (Vermont politician) (1791–1864), Vermont State Senate